Tatya Tope Nagar Sports Complex Bhopal is a multi-purposed stadium in Bhopal, Madhya Pradesh, India. Directorate Sports & Youth Welfare is located at the stadium. The stadium is the base of Boxing Academy, Madhya Pradesh State Men's Hockey Academy, Madhya Pradesh State Equestrian Academy, Madhya Pradesh State Shooting Academy, Madhya Pradesh State Water Sports Academy and DSYW Academy.

Stadium is one of the stadiums in Madhya Pradesh with a multi-purpose hall and an Olympic swimming pool among the facilities offered. Football, athletics, volleyball, hockey, basketball, badminton, cricket, handball, table tennis, taekwondo, and wrestling can be enjoyed here.

The ground hosted its only first-class cricket match in 1982 between Madhya Pradesh cricket team and Vidarbha cricket team where home team won by 202 runs.
 Association football club Hamidia FC use the stadium for some of their matches.

See also 

 Model Higher Secondary School, TT Nagar, Bhopal
 Aishbagh Stadium
 Barkatullah University Stadium

References

External links 

 Cricinfo
 Wikimapia

Sports venues in Bhopal
Cricket grounds in Madhya Pradesh
1982 establishments in Madhya Pradesh